J. B. M. Hertzog became the Prime Minister of South Africa on 30 June 1924, replacing Jan Smuts. Hertzog led four cabinets, serving until 5 September 1939.

Ministers

First Hertzog Cabinet
The general election of 1924 led to the first political transition since the formation of the Union of South Africa in 1910. The training that J. B. M. Hertzog between 1924 and 1929 government was a coalition between the National Party (NP) and the Labour Party (LP).

Second Hertzog Cabinet
The 1929 general election was won by the National Party (41% of votes) due to its absolute majority in seats (78) facing the South African Party who had received 47% of the vote, but only 61 representatives. Although the National Party had a majority government, Hertzog renewed the electoral alliance with the Labour Party (8 elected), Frederic Creswell

 Ernest George Jansen, Ministers of Native Affairs and Irrigation
 Nicolaas Havenga, Minister of Finance
 Oswald Pirow, Minister of Justice
 Frederic Creswell, LP, Minister of Defence, Minister of Labour
 Minister of Railways and Harbors Charles Wynand Malan
 Minister of Lands Peter Grobler
 Minister of Agriculture Jan Kemp
 Minister of Mines and Industry Adriaan Fourie
 Minister of Public Works and Posts and Telegraphs Henry William Sampson LP

Third Hertzog Cabinet

Fourth Hertzog Cabinet

See also
 Prime Minister of South Africa

References

Government of South Africa
Executive branch of the government of South Africa
Cabinets of South Africa
1924 establishments in South Africa
1939 disestablishments in South Africa
Cabinets established in 1924
Cabinets disestablished in 1939